Alércio Dias (died 3 September 2020) was a Brazilian lawyer and politician who served as a Deputy from 1983 to 1987. He was involved in drawing up a new Constitution of Brazil in 1988.

In 1979 he became director of the Companhia de Eletricidade do Acre (Eletroacre).

His son was Feliciano Dias Neto.

He died at the Hospital Santa Juliana, in Rio Branco, of complications from a gastro-intestinal problem.

References

1940s births
2020 deaths
Brazilian politicians